The Redmi K40 is a line of Android-based smartphones manufactured by Xiaomi and marketed under its Redmi sub-brand. There are several models, the K40, K40 Pro, K40 Pro+, K40 Gaming and K40S. In the global market the Redmi K40 was launched as POCO F3 and the Redmi K40 Pro+ was launched as Xiaomi Mi 11i. In April 2021 the Redmi K40 and K40 Pro+ were released in India as Xiaomi Mi 11X and Mi 11X Pro. In July 2021 the Redmi K40 Gaming was released globally as POCO F3 GT. The Redmi K40S was released globally as POCO F4 but with improved specs.

Design 
The front and back panels are made of Gorilla Glass 5, except in the Redmi K40S and Poco F4 where the back panel is made of plastic. The frame is made of aluminium and covered by polycarbonate.

The design of the Redmi K40, K40 Pro and K40 Pro+ is similar to the Mi 11. The design of the Redmi K40S is similar to the Redmi K50 and K50 Pro but with flat edges.

On the bottom side are a USB-C port, speaker, microphone and dual SIM tray. On the top side there are two additional microphones, IR blaster and second speaker. On the right side there are a volume rocker and a power button with an integrated fingerprint scanner.

Colours 

 The Redmi K40 is available in 3 colours: Bright Black, Dreamland (silver) and Sunny Snow (white).
 The Redmi K40 Pro and K40 Pro+ are available in 3 colors: Ink Feather (black feather pattern), Dreamland (silver) and Sunny Snow (white).
 The POCO F3 is available in 3 colours: Night Black, Arctic White and Deep Ocean Blue. Also later was added Moonlight Silver variant which has the same design as Deep Ocean Blue but in silver colour.
 Xiaomi Mi 11 is available in 3 colours: Cosmic Black, Celestial Silver and Frosty White.
 Xiaomi Mi 11X and Mi 11X Pro are available in 3 colours: Cosmic Black, Celestial Silver and Lunar White.
 Redmi K40S is available in 4 colours: Bright Black, Silent Flower (green), Silver Traces and Magic Mirror (blue-purple gradient).

References

External links 

Mobile phones introduced in 2021
Android (operating system) devices
Phablets
Mobile phones with multiple rear cameras
Mobile phones with 4K video recording
Mobile phones with 8K video recording
Mobile phones with infrared transmitter
K40
Discontinued smartphones